Frederick James Atkinson (24 August 1919 – 1991) was an English footballer who played as a wing half.

Atkinson played his entire career for Gateshead, originally signing in December 1945. He scored a total of 7 goals in 39 appearances in the league and FA Cup.

Sources

1919 births
1991 deaths
English footballers
Association football wing halves
Gateshead A.F.C. players
English Football League players